Netechma niveonigra is a species of moth of the family Tortricidae. It is endemic to Ecuador (Loja Province).

The ground colour of the forewings is white, with black dots scattered all over the surface of the wing. The markings are black. The hindwings are white and creamy and tinged with brownish in the apical third where pale brownish grey dots are found.

References

External links

Moths described in 2002
Endemic fauna of Ecuador
niveonigra
Moths of South America
Taxa named by Józef Razowski